Allen Reisner (born September 29, 1988) is a former American football tight end. He played college football at Iowa.

Professional career

Minnesota Vikings
Reisner was signed by the Minnesota Vikings as an undrafted free agent following the end of the NFL lockout on July 26, 2011. Reisner was released from the Vikings on October 4, 2011. Reisner was signed back to the Vikings October 5, 2011 and placed on practice squad. He was signed to the Minnesota Vikings on November 26, 2011.

Jacksonville Jaguars
Reisner was claimed off waivers by the Jacksonville Jaguars on December 24, 2012.

On October 8, 2013, Reisner was placed on the injured reserve-designated for return list. He returned to the active roster on December 14.

Second stint with Minnesota
Reisner re-signed with the Minnesota Vikings on April 15, 2014. However, despite finishing with the most touchdowns and most receptions for the Vikings in the 2014 preseason, he was cut by the team on August 30, 2014, as the roster was reduced to 53 for the season ahead.

Baltimore Ravens
Reisner was signed by the Baltimore Ravens on November 17, 2014. He was later waived on December 3, 2014, but re-signed on December 9, 2014.

Personal life
On July 6, 2013, Reisner married longtime girlfriend and high school sweetheart, Lauren Perry, daughter of Syncbak founder Jack Perry.

References

External links
 Iowa Hawkeyes bio

Living people
American football tight ends
Iowa Hawkeyes football players
Minnesota Vikings players
Jacksonville Jaguars players
New England Patriots players
Baltimore Ravens players
1988 births
People from Marion, Iowa